Cleland is a surname of Scottish origin.

People named Cleland 

Alec Cleland (born 1970), Scottish footballer
Andrew N. Cleland (born 1961), American physicist
Carol Cleland (born 1948), American philosopher
Cook Cleland (1916–2007), US air race pilot
David Cleland, co-founder of the Nature Foundation in South Australia in 1981
David I. Cleland (1926–2018), US engineer, academic and author of project management textbooks
Donald Cleland (1901–1975), Australian soldier and administrator
E. Davenport Cleland (1854–1928), journalist and mine manager in South Australia and Western Australia
Edward Erskine Cleland (1869–1943), South Australian jurist
Hance Cleland (1884–1859), American politician
James Cleland (footballer) (1870–1940), Scottish (soccer) footballer
James Cleland (politician) (1839–1908), Scottish-born merchant and political figure in Ontario, Canada
James Cleland (statistician) (1770–1840) was a Scottish statistician and historical writer
James William Cleland (1874–1914), Scottish politician
Joan Burton Cleland (1916–2000), South Australian ornithologist
:John Cleland (disambiguation), multiple people, including
John Cleland (1709–1789), English novelist.
 John Cleland (racing driver) (born 1952), Scottish racing driver
 John Burton Cleland (1878–1971), South Australian microbiologist and naturalist
 John Fullerton Cleland (1821–1901), missionary in China and South Australian public servant
 John Cleland (anatomist) (1835–1925), Regius Professor of Anatomy (Glasgow)
 John R. D. Cleland, US major general, of 8th Infantry Division (United States)
Marshall Cleland (1912–1958), Canadian equestrian champion
Max Cleland (1942–2021), American politician
Rachel Cleland (1906–2002), Australian expatriate community and social welfare worker
Ralph Erskine Cleland (1892–1971), American botanist
Robert Hardy Cleland (born 1947), US District Judge
Tammy Cleland (born 1975), US swimmer
Thomas Maitland Cleland (1880–1964), US book designer, painter, illustrator, and type designer
Victoria Cleland (born 1970), Chief Cashier of the Bank of England
William Cleland (poet) (c. 1661–1689), Scottish poet and soldier
W. Wallace Cleland (1930–2013), US biochemistry professor

See also
 Cleland (disambiguation)
 Clelland
Clevland of Tapeley Park, Devon

English-language surnames
Surnames of English origin